The 2020 Villanova Wildcats football team represented Villanova University in the 2020–21 NCAA Division I FCS football season. They were led by fourth-year head coach Mark Ferrante and played their home games at Villanova Stadium. They competed as a member of the Colonial Athletic Association.

On July 17, 2020, the Colonial Athletic Association announced that it would not play fall sports due to the COVID-19 pandemic. However, the conference is allowing the option for teams to play as independents for the 2020 season if they still wish to play in the fall.

Previous season

The Wildcats finished the 2019 season 9–4, 5–3 in CAA play to finish in a tie for third place. They received an at-large bid to the FCS Playoffs where they lost in the first round to Southeastern Louisiana.

Schedule
Villanova had games scheduled against Lehigh (September 3) and Bucknell (September 12), but canceled these games on July 13 due to the Patriot League's decision to cancel fall sports due to the COVID-19 pandemic. The CAA released its spring conference schedule on October 27, 2020.

References

Villanova
Villanova Wildcats football seasons
Villanova Wildcats football